The Second Toulouse Congress was the twenty-third national congress of the French Socialist Party (Parti socialiste or PS), the congress was held from October 26 to 28, 2012, in the city of Toulouse in the Haute-Garonne.

First Secretary Martine Aubry announced that she would not run for a second term. The National Secretary for Coordination Harlem Désir became the next party leader.

Motions
Five motions were voted upon by members:

Motion 1: "Mobilise the French People for a Successful Change" (Mobiliser les Français pour réussir le changement): Led by Harlem Désir and supported by Martine Aubry, Prime Minister Jean-Marc Ayrault, all socialist members of the Cabinet and a majority of MPs.
Motion 2: "Matter of Principle" (Question de principes): Led by Juliette Méadel and endorsed by Gaëtan Gorce.
Motion 3: "Now the Left" (Maintenant la gauche): Led by Emmanuel Maurel and supported by Marie-Noëlle Lienemann, Gérard Filoche, Jérôme Guedj and the Utopia movement.
Motion 4: "Dare. Further. Faster" (Oser. Plus loin. Plus vite): Led by Stéphane Hessel and supported by Pierre Larrouturou.
Motion 5: "Toulouse, my Congress" (Toulouse, mon congrès): Motion led by Constance Blanchard.

Results of the Motions vote

Election of the First Secretary

On October 12, 2012, Emmanuel Maurel confirmed that he would be a candidate for the Party Leadership. He lost to Harlem Désir.

References

Congresses of the Socialist Party (France)
2012 in France
2012 in politics
2012 conferences
2012 political party leadership elections
October 2012 events in France